As a signatory to the World Anti-Doping Code, the International Association of Athletics Federations (IAAF) prohibits the use of banned performance-enhancing substances by competitors at the World Championships in Athletics. A list of WADA-banned substances is regularly published to the public and amended as scientific knowledge expands. The IAAF and anti-doping bodies undertake in-competition sampling of athletes blood and urine in order to detect where athletes have taken banned substances. This is also complemented by out-of-competition tests during the tournament and in the preceding period.

Where a banned substance is detected in-competition the athlete's performance will be annulled and—depending on the severity of the infraction—the athlete may be banned from the sport for a set period. Where an out-of-competition sample tests positive for a banned substance, any performances by the athlete after that date may also be annulled. Athletes may also be banned via doping regulations if the athlete fails to submit to testing, tampers or interferes with the undertaking of anti-doping procedures, or is found in possession of banned substances. Where a performance is annulled, any medals won by the athlete will be stripped from the athlete and the IAAF may decided to reallocate the medal(s) to the next best performers. This includes disqualification of whole national relay teams should one member break anti-doping rules. Samples are stored for future retesting, as improved methods over time may lead to previously unidentified cases of doping. The IAAF began a long-term storage approach from the 2007 World Championships onwards.

A total of 162 athletes (69 men and 93 women) have had their results annulled at the World Championships, and 40 of these have been stripped of medals as a result. A total of 53 medals have been stripped as a result of doping infractions. The first doping failure pre-dates the main championships and comes from Spanish hurdler Rosa Colorado at the 1980 World Championships in Athletics – an event which only featured two women's events not on the Olympic programme. World champions to be banned include North American sprinters Ben Johnson, Marion Jones, Tim Montgomery and Kelli White. Other prominent champions to have been banned include Russian middle-distance runner Mariya Savinova, steeplechaser Yuliya Zaripova and racewalker Olga Kaniskina. The majority of stripped medallists have come from Russia.

There has been an upward trend in the number of doping violations at the championships, with a peak of 50 athletes having had their performances annulled at the 2011 event, though it is assumed that this reflects improved detection rather than increased overall doping – an anonymous survey at that championships revealed over 30% of athletes had used banned substances during their career.

Given the susceptibility of the sport of athletics to doping issues, the IAAF has been central in the development of anti-doping standards and anti-doping measures have been were present at World Championships since the first edition in 1983. The anti-doping approach had a new development at the 2017 World Championships in Athletics, where all Russian athletes were banned due to state-sponsored doping and had to request dispensation to compete at Authorised Neutral Athletes.

Disqualifications by year

.

Disqualifications by nation

This table collates the total number of athletes who have been disqualified for doping at the championships by nation. Athletes with multiple disqualifications are counted as one. Where a relay team is disqualified, this is counted as one disqualification, though multiple team members may have been sanctioned.

Last updated 17 March 2018

 Russia's total for women's disqualifications and stripped medals includes the performances of Nailya Yulamanova, who helped Russia secure a bronze medal at the 2009 World Marathon Cup (held in conjunction with the 2009 World Championships marathon) but was later banned and had her team's performance annulled.

Disqualifications by event
This table collates the total number of disqualifications within a given event. Where the same athlete has been disqualified at multiple editions of the championships, each athlete disqualified per year is counted.
Last updated 17 March 2018

 Includes precursor women's walk event over 10,000 m

Disqualified athletes

See also
Doping at the Olympic Games
List of doping cases in athletics

References

List of banned athletes
2017 World Championships in Athletics Statistics Book (pp. 82–87). IAAF (2017). Retrieved 2018-03-17.

Doping
World Championships in Athletics
Lists of sportspeople
+World Championships in Athletics